Walter Rowlands (born 1888) was an English footballer who played for Stoke.

Career
Rowlands was born in Stoke-upon-Trent and played amateur football with Munton Juniors before joining Stoke in 1914. He played in one first team match which came in a 4–1 defeat to Pontypridd during the 1913–14 season before returning to amateur football with Stafford Rangers.

Career statistics

References

English footballers
Stoke City F.C. players
1888 births
Year of death missing
Stafford Rangers F.C. players
Association football midfielders